The Secret of The Purple Reef is a 1960 20th Century Fox CinemaScope DeLuxe Color film based on a short story by Dorothy Cottrell entitled "The Silent Reefs". It starred soon-to-be-famous actors Richard Chamberlain and Peter Falk. It is a Caribbean-based mystery involving the disappearance of a ship called the Cloud.

Although considered a "B" film, The Secret of The Purple Reef is notable in that it introduces Richard Chamberlain and Peter Falk to moviegoers as part of their early film career.

It was Richard Chamberlain's film debut, made before finding fame as Dr Kildare. In 1986 Chamberlain called it "easily the worst movie ever made, or at least the most boring".

Plot
Brothers Mark (Jeff Richards) and Dean Christopher (Richard Chamberlain) and  show up in a mid-'50s four door Citroën Traction Avant in early era San Juan, Puerto Rico. They arrive to solve the mystery of the circumstances of their father's drowning death in the Caribbean. They run up against a gang of unruly pirates who seem to know more than they reveal. One of the film's highlights is several scenes of an E.G. Van de Stadt designed 35 foot sailing yacht, the Starwright.  The vessel adds to the Caribbean charm and plays an integral part of moving the pirates to other parts of the island.

Cast
 Jeff Richards as Mark Christopher
 Margia Dean as Rue Amboy
 Peter Falk as Tom Weber
 Richard Chamberlain as Dean Christopher
 Terence De Marney as Ashby
 Robert Earl Jones as Tobias
 Gina Petrushka as Grandmere
 Larry Markow as Kilt
 Philip Rosen as Twine
 Frank Ricco as Henri
 Jerry Mitchell as Jerry

Production
The story was published in 1953.

Robert L. Lippert brought Peter Falk to Hollywood to appear in Murder Inc. Lippert liked him so much he used him on this film, which was shot in Puerto Rico. Filming took place in July 1960.

Margia Dean enjoyed working with direction Witney and later hired him when she produced The Long Rope (1961).

See also
 List of American films of 1960

References
 Cottrell, Dorothy. (1952)  The Silent Reefs. Curtiss Publishing Company. New York.
 Halliwell, Leslie.  (1977) The Filmgoers Companion 6th Ed.  Avon Books. New York. pp. 135, 249.
 Katz, Ephraim.  The Film Encyclopedia (1979) HarperCollins Publishing. New York.  pp. 222,400.
 The Films of 20th Century Fox 1st Edition. (1979)  Citadel Press. New Jersey.  pp. 322.

External links
 
 
 
 

1960 films
American drama films
1960 drama films
Films directed by William Witney
Films based on short fiction
20th Century Fox films
CinemaScope films
Films produced by Gene Corman
Films set in the Caribbean
Films set in Puerto Rico
Seafaring films
1960s English-language films
1960s American films